Diplomatic relations exist between the Commonwealth of the Bahamas and the United Mexican States. Both nations are members of the Association of Caribbean States, Organization of American States and the United Nations.

History
The Bahamas and Mexico established diplomatic relations on 24 January 1974. Relations between both nations are limited and have taken place primarily in multilateral forums. In May 1992, Mexican Foreign Minister Fernando Solana paid a visit to the Bahamas to attend the 22nd General Assembly of the Organization of American States. In July 2001, Mexican President Vicente Fox paid a visit to Nassau to attend the Caribbean Community summit. In 2002, Bahamian Prime Minister Hubert Ingraham paid a visit to Mexico to attend the Monterrey Consensus in the Mexican city of Monterrey.

In April 2014, Bahamian Prime Minister Perry Christie paid a visit to Mérida, Mexico to attend the Caribbean Community summit. While in Mexico, Prime Minister Christie met with Mexican President Enrique Peña Nieto and both leaders discussed their desire for the advancement of relations between both nations given its Caribbean connection and ongoing partnership both within the bilateral and multilateral contexts.

In June 2017, Bahamian Foreign Minister Darren Henfield paid a visit to Cancún to attend the 47th General Assembly of the Organization of American States. Each year, the Mexican government offers scholarships for nationals of the Bahamas to study postgraduate studies at Mexican higher education institutions.

High-level visits

High-level visits from the Bahamas to Mexico
 Prime Minister Hubert Ingraham (2002)
 Minister of the Environment Earl Deveaux  (2010)
 Prime Minister Perry Christie (2014)
 Foreign Minister Darren Henfield (2017)

High-level visits from Mexico to the Bahamas
 Foreign Minister Fernando Solana (1992)
 President Vicente Fox (2001)

Bilateral agreements
Both nations have signed a few bilateral agreements such an Agreement for Scientific and Technical Cooperation (1992); Agreement for Exchange of Information on Tax Matters (2010); and an Agreement on the Elimination of Visas for Ordinary Passport holders (2010).

Trade
In 2018, trade between the Bahamas and Mexico totaled US$41.9 million dollars. The Bahamas main exports to Mexico include: oil, spirit drinks, aluminum and petroleum gas. Mexico's main exports to the Bahamas include: oil, telephones and mobile phones; refrigerators and freezers; and automobiles for touristic purposes. The Bahamas is the 36th largest foreign investor in Mexico. Between 1999–2017, foreign direct investment from the Bahamas to Mexico totaled $268 million dollars. Mexican multinational company Cemex operates in the Bahamas.

Diplomatic missions
 The Bahamas is accredited to Mexico from its embassy in Washington, D.C., United States.
 Mexico is accredited to the Bahamas from its embassy in Kingston, Jamaica and maintains an honorary consulate in Nassau.

References